Herbert Kajumba (born 21 January 1950) is a Ugandan field hockey player. He competed in the men's tournament at the 1972 Summer Olympics.

References

External links
 

1950 births
Living people
Ugandan male field hockey players
Olympic field hockey players of Uganda
Field hockey players at the 1972 Summer Olympics
Place of birth missing (living people)